The 2019 Tro-Bro Léon was a one-day road cycling race that took place on 22 April 2019. It was the 36th edition of the Tro-Bro Léon and was rated as a 1.1 event as part of the 2019 UCI Europe Tour. It was also the eighth event of the 2019 French Road Cycling Cup.

The race was won by Andrea Vendrame.

Teams
Twenty teams were invited to take part in the race. These included two UCI WorldTeams, eleven UCI Professional Continental teams and seven UCI Continental teams.

Result

References

External links

2019 UCI Europe Tour
2019 in French sport
2019